The Tigris chub (''Petroleuciscus kurui') is a species of cyprinid fish endemic to the upper Tigris drainage in southeastern Turkey.

References

Petroleuciscus
Fish described in 1995
Fish of Turkey
Taxobox binomials not recognized by IUCN